Anumta Qureshi is a Pakistani television actress. She is known for her dramas roles in Mera Rab Waris, Bisaat e Dil, Sanwari, and Bharosa Pyar Tera. She is best known for her role in Suno Chanda and Suno Chanda 2 as Huma.

Personal life
Anumta is married to singer Sarang Kazi. In June 5, 2022 she had her first child, a boy named Babar.

Filmography

Television series

Web series

References

External links
 
 

1997 births
Living people
Pakistani television actresses
21st-century Pakistani actresses